Wellingborough London Road railway station is a former railway station in Wellingborough, Northamptonshire on a line which connected Peterborough and Northampton.

History
The station opened in 1845 and closed in 1964 to passengers and closed fully in 1966.

Stationmasters

Henry Cooper 1850 - 1853
J.V. Jarrett 1853 - 1856 (afterwards station master at Leighton Buzzard)
T.B. Dixon 1856 - 1861 (formerly station master at Market Harborough, afterwards station master at Leighton Buzzard)
John Green 1861 - 1896
William Henry Judge 1896 - 1898 (afterwards station master at Market Harborough)
William Jackson 1898 - 1902 (afterwards station master at Higham Ferrers)
David Horne 1902 - 1920 (formerly station master at Higham Ferrers)
Horace Edward Neale 1920 - ca. 1923

From 1930 the station master was in charge of both the Midland Road and London Road stations.

Location
This station was on an important junction with a link to the Midland Main Line at  Wellingborough Midland Road  which enabled through running from Northampton to Midland Road, Kettering and Leicester. The station remains have gone with the line ending under the A45.

The former service 
The service was from Peterborough to Northampton via Wellingborough.

See also 
Wellingborough
Wellingborough railway station
London and Birmingham Railway

References

External links 
 Subterranea Britannica

Disused railway stations in Northamptonshire
Railway stations in Great Britain opened in 1845
Railway stations in Great Britain closed in 1964
Former London and Birmingham Railway stations
Beeching closures in England
John William Livock buildings
Wellingborough